The 2014–15 Czech Extraliga season is the 22nd season of the Czech Extraliga since its creation after the breakup of Czechoslovakia and the Czechoslovak First Ice Hockey League in 1993.

Regular season

Scoring leaders 

 
List shows the ten best skaters based on the number of points during the regular season. If two or more skaters are tied (i.e. same number of points, goals and played games), all of the tied skaters are shown.
GP = Games played; G = Goals; A = Assists; Pts = Points; +/– = Plus/minus; PIM = Penalty minutes

Leading goaltenders 

These are the leaders in GAA among goaltenders who played at least 40% of the team's minutes. The table is sorted by GAA, and the criteria for inclusion are bolded.

GP = Games played; TOI = Time on ice (minutes); GA = Goals against; SO = Shutouts; Sv% = Save percentage; GAA = Goals against average

Playoffs

Play-in Round
 HC Vítkovice Steel - HC ČSOB Pojišťovna Pardubice 1:3 (8:2, 2:4, 6:3, 5:0)
 HC Škoda Plzeň - BK Mladá Boleslav 1:3 (4:5, 2:1, 4:2, 4:2)

Play-off final: HC Oceláři Třinec - HC Verva Litvínov 3:4 (1:3, 2:3, 0:1, 3:0, 2:1 P, 6:3, 0:2). HC Litvínov has won its first ever league title.

Relegation

References

External links 
 

Czech
2014–15 in Czech ice hockey leagues
Czech Extraliga seasons